Arthur Wiesner (1895–1980) was a German stage and film actor. He appeared in twenty eight films and television series.

Selected filmography
 Happiness is the Main Thing (1941)
 Beloved World (1942)
 Tonelli (1943)
 Street Acquaintances (1948)
 Night of the Twelve (1949)
 Bürgermeister Anna (1950)
 Love's Awakening (1953)
 Rose Bernd (1957)

References

Bibliography
 Giesen, Rolf. Nazi Propaganda Films: A History and Filmography. McFarland & Company, 2003.

External links 
 

1895 births
1980 deaths
People from Świdnica
People from the Province of Silesia
German male film actors
German male stage actors
20th-century German male actors